The Church of Jesus Christ of Latter-day Saints in Cape Verde refers to the Church of Jesus Christ of Latter-day Saints (LDS Church) and its members in Cape Verde.  At year-end 1989, there were 25 members in Cape Verde. In 2019, there were 16,334 members in 41 congregations. Cape Verde has more LDS Church members per capita than the United States as well more members per capita than any other country outside of Oceania and South America.

History

Missionaries first came to Cape Verde in 1988 the first congregation was Praia/Lajes Branch.

In 1998, Gordon B. Hinckley visited the islands and met with members and government officials.

Stakes and Districts
As of February 2023, the following stakes and districts exist in Cape Verde:

Mission
The Cape Verde Praia Mission was organized on July 1, 2002.

Temples

On October 7, 2018 the Praia Cape Verde Temple was announced by church president Russell M. Nelson. Ground was broken for construction on May 4, 2019.

References

External links
 Newsroom: Cape Verde - News and Information (Portuguese)
 Newsroom (Cape Verde) - Facts and Statistics
 The Church of Jesus Christ of Latter-day Saints - Official Site
 ComeUntoChrist.org - Visitors Site

Christian denominations in Cape Verde
The Church of Jesus Christ of Latter-day Saints in Africa